La Breña y Marismas del Barbate Natural Park is a natural park on the coast of the province of Cádiz, Spain.  The park includes marine and terrestrial ecosystems.
An area of the natural park has been planted with pines to control the spread of sand-dunes.

The fishing-port of Barbate is on the edge of the park.

Gallery

See also 
 Barbate

External links 
 Official information at Junta de Andalucía website
 Natural Park of La Breña y Marismas del Barbate

Geography of the Province of Cádiz
Marine reserves of Spain
Natural parks of Spain
Natural parks of Andalusia
Protected areas established in 1989